The Furniture Manufacturing Eco Museum in Tainan is a museum in Rende District, Tainan, Taiwan.

History
The museum building was originally the manufacturing building for the Yongxing Furniture built in 1958. The factory building was converted to museum after 50 years of its furniture manufacturing processes due to its relocation to Mainland China. Planning and renovation works were done in three years and the museum was officially opened in May 2005.

Architecture
The museum was constructed with 1960s and 1970s architectural style of Taiwanese houses.

Exhibitions
The museum exhibits the history and evolution of the furniture industry in Taiwan. It also displays some classic domestic and international wooden furniture.

Transportation
The museum is accessible within walking distance southwest from Bao'an Station of the Taiwan Railways.

See also
 List of museums in Taiwan

References

External links
  

2005 establishments in Taiwan
Art museums and galleries in Taiwan
Furniture museums
Museums established in 2005
Museums in Tainan